Myles O'Reilly is an Irish musician and film-maker.

Biography

O'Reilly began performing in the group Juno Falls in 2003. The group were signed to V2 Records and released two albums, Starlight Drive in 2004, and Weightless in 2007. O'Reilly began directing music videos and music documentary films in 2010. He has directed music videos for Lisa Hannigan, Glen Hansard, Villagers and James Vincent McMorrow among others. In 2017, O'Reilly documented Irish musician Martin Hayes on tour in India. O'Reilly began releasing ambient music under the name [Indistinct Chatter] in 2020. In June 2021, O'Reilly co-wrote, recorded, engineered, produced and mixed the album Tá Go Maith by Rónán Ó Snodaigh.

Discography 

Solo Albums

Cocooning Heart, 2022

As [Indistinct Chatter]

Tall As Houses, 2020
Cabin Lights Off, 2020
My Mother's Star, 2021

With Juno Falls

 Starlight Drive, 2004	
 Weightless, 2007

Documentary films

 Backwards to Go Forwards (2019)
 Come On Up to the House (2019)
 This Ain't No Disco EP IV (2018)
 Sister India (2018)
 This Ain't No Disco EP III (2018)
 This Ain't No Disco EP II (2017)
 This Little Light of Mine (2017)
 My Ireland (2017)
 This Ain't No Disco EP I (2016)
 Glen Hansard Didn't He Ramble (2015)
 The Sound of a Country (2015)
 The Greatest Busk on Grafton Street (2017)

References

Date of birth missing (living people)
Living people
Irish film directors
Irish male singer-songwriters
21st-century Irish male singers
Year of birth missing (living people)